Karakudamono, Tangguozi in Chinese，is a Japanese term used to collectively describe assorted pastry confections of Chinese origin (also called togashi) that were introduced to Japan through the efforts of an envoy to Tang China. These Chinese-style pastries were used as offerings at Shinto shrines and Buddhist temples. During the Heian period the pastries become an important feature of the newly established Japanese aristocracy's banquet tables.

Among the earliest recorded karakudamono to reach Japan was a pastry of Indian origin called modaka. Known in Chinese as "balls of joy" (huanxituan), its name appears in a Japanese dictionary dating to the early 10th century. This pastry is still sold in Kyoto where it is called seijo̅ kankidan. It is also prepared using traditional methods at Shinto shrines throughout Japan including Kamigamo Jinja in Kyoto, Kasuga Taisha in Nara and Nichieda Jinja in Shiga Prefecture.

Karakudamono are also attested to in The Tale of Genji.

See also
 List of pastries

References 

Japanese confectionery
Pastries